Musikmarkt was a magazine of the music industry in Germany, Austria and Switzerland, which is based in Munich. Die Welt, a German newspaper, described the magazine as the music industry’s thermometer.

History and profile
Musikmarkt was established by publisher Josef Keller Verlag in 1959. Uwe Lencher served as the editor-in-chief of the magazine for twenty-three years from 1973 to his death in April 1996. The magazine had its headquarters in Munich. The magazine was started as a bi-monthly publication. Then it was published weekly until 2014 when its frequency was switched to monthly.

Musikmarkt determined the official German charts from its start in 1959 to the 1970s when Media Control assumed the responsibility. The magazine also contained the weekly Top 100 charts for singles and albums when it was published on a weekly basis. The magazine and its website were both closed down in July 2016. Stefan Zarges was the last editor of the magazine.

Circulation
Under the editorship of Uwe Lencher the circulation of Musikmarkt was nearly 12,000 copies, making it a significant publication for German entertainment industry. It was 4,370 copies when it was shut down in 2016.

References

External links
Official website
WorldCat Record

1959 establishments in West Germany
2016 disestablishments in Germany
Defunct magazines published in Germany
Bi-monthly magazines published in Germany
Business magazines published in Germany
German-language magazines
Monthly magazines published in Germany
Music magazines published in Germany
Weekly magazines published in Germany
Magazines established in 1959
Magazines disestablished in 2016
Magazines published in Munich
Professional and trade magazines